Second National Bank of Meyersdale, also known as Gallatin National Bank and Meyersdale Borough Building, is a historic bank building in Meyersdale, Somerset County, Pennsylvania.  It was built in 1909, and is a two-story brick building with limestone masonry on its primary elevations. It measures 60 feet by 30 feet and features matching columns supporting a large pediment on the main facade in the Classical Revival style. The building was restored to its 1909 appearance in 1999, when it was reoccupied by a bank after housing borough offices starting in 1983.

It was added to the National Register of Historic Places in 2002.

References

Commercial buildings on the National Register of Historic Places in Pennsylvania
Neoclassical architecture in Pennsylvania
Commercial buildings completed in 1909
Buildings and structures in Somerset County, Pennsylvania
National Register of Historic Places in Somerset County, Pennsylvania